Jeff McMartin (born November 21, 1967) is an American football and track and field coach.  He is currently the head football coach at Central College in Pella, Iowa, a position he has held since 2004. McMartin was the head men's and women's track and field coach at Beloit College from 1995 to 2000.

Head coaching record

College

References

External links
 Central College profile

1967 births
Living people
Beloit Buccaneers football coaches
Central Dutch football coaches
DePauw Tigers football coaches
Illinois Wesleyan Titans football coaches
Rochester Yellowjackets football coaches
Wake Forest Demon Deacons football coaches
College track and field coaches in the United States
Central College (Iowa) alumni
Wake Forest University alumni